Sebastião Cícero Guimarães Passos (1867-1909) was a Brazilian journalist and poet. He was born in Maceió, the son of Major Tito Alexandre Ferreira Passos and Rita Vieira Guimarães Passos. He did his primary and preparatory studies in Alagoas. At the age of 19 he went to Rio de Janeiro, where he joined the young bohemians of the time. He started writing for papers such as Gazeta da Tarde, Gazeta de Notícias, A Semana, both under his own name and under a variety of pseudonyms. He was associated with other contemporary figures such as Paula Ney, Olavo Bilac, Coelho Neto, José do Patrocínio, Luís Murat and Artur Azevedo.

He also worked as an archivist at the Imperial House. With the proclamation of the Brazilian Republic, he lost his job and began to live solely off his journalistic work. When the Revolta de Armada kicked off in September 1893, he joined the movement. He was part of the revolutionary government installed in Paraná, and fought against Floriano Peixoto. Afterwards he went into exile in Buenos Aires for 18 months. There he wrote for the newspapers La Nación and La Prensa and held events on literary topics related to Brazil.

In 1896, back from exile, he was one of the first poets called to form the Academia Brasileira de Letras. He chose as his patron another bohemian, the poet Laurindo Rabelo. His former contemporaries had by now moved on, although Passos remained true to his bohemian ideals. He fell ill with tuberculosis and, failing to improve in Brazil, left for the island of Madeira and, from there, to Paris, where he died in 1909. Only in 1921 did the Brazilian Academy manage to have his remains transferred to the Brazil. They arrived accompanied by those of Raimundo Correia, who had also died in Paris in 1911.

A Parnassian poet, Guimarães Passos was also a humorist in his writings for O Filhote, later collected in the book Pimentões, which he published in partnership with Olavo Bilac. His poetry was also praised by critics such as José Veríssimo.

References

Brazilian poets
1867 births
1909 deaths
People from Maceió